Jozef Schoeters (12 May 1947 – 1 May 1998) was a Belgian cyclist. He competed in the individual road race at the 1968 Summer Olympics.

References

External links
 

1947 births
1998 deaths
Belgian male cyclists
Olympic cyclists of Belgium
Cyclists at the 1968 Summer Olympics
Cyclists from Antwerp